Jorge Alberto del Río Sálas (born 30 October 1918) was an Argentinian sailor. Born in Buenos Aires, he competed at four Olympics between 1948 and 1964.

Sálas won silver at age 46 at the 1960 Olympics in the Mixed Three Person Keelboat (Dragon class), with Héctor Calegaris and his cousin Jorge Alberto Salas Chávez.  His team had come fourth in the same event eight years earlier.

Sálas is related to the Sieburger sailing clan by marriage. He married Marylin Sieburger – the daughter of Enrique Sieburger, Sr., sister of Carlos and Enrique Sieburger, Jr., cousin of Roberto Sieburger, and niece of Julio Sieburger. Their son Sandro del Río Sieburger is a national Cadet class sailing champion and marathon runner.

References

External links
 

1918 births
Possibly living people
Argentine male sailors (sport)
Olympic sailors of Argentina
Sailors at the 1948 Summer Olympics – Dragon
Sailors at the 1952 Summer Olympics – Dragon
Sailors at the 1960 Summer Olympics – Dragon
Sailors at the 1964 Summer Olympics – Dragon
Olympic silver medalists for Argentina
Argentine people of Spanish descent
Olympic medalists in sailing
Medalists at the 1960 Summer Olympics